Lendava Sports Park is a multi-use stadium in Lendava, Slovenia. It is currently used mostly for football matches and is the home ground of NK Nafta 1903. The stadium, initially built in 1946, was completely rebuilt in 2006 and has a capacity of 2,000 seats.

The stadium has a UEFA licence for international matches and is used as one of the main venues for the Slovenian women's national team.

See also
List of football stadiums in Slovenia

References

External links
Športni park Lendava on Football Stadiums of Slovenia

Football venues in Slovenia
Multi-purpose stadiums in Slovenia
Sports venues completed in 1946